Fra is a title of a friar.

Fra or FRA may also refer to:

Codes 
 fra, the ISO 639-2 code for the French language
 FRA, the ISO 3166-1 alpha-3 code for France
 FRA, the IOC country code for France at the Olympics
 Framingham station, Amtrak station code
 Frankfurt am Main Airport, Germany, IATA code

Education 
 Flint River Academy, Woodbury, Georgia, US
 Franklin Road Academy, Nashville, Tennessee, US

Molecular biology 
 Fra1, aka Fos-related antigen 1
 Fra2, aka Fos-related antigen 2

Agencies, organizations, companies
 Alfarista Radical Front, an Ecuadorian political party
 Federal Railroad Administration, USA
 Fleet Reserve Association
 Fundamental Rights Agency of the European Union
 Forces Royales Air, the official French name for the Royal Moroccan Air Force
 National Defence Radio Establishment, in Sweden
 FRA law, in Sweden

Other uses 
 Fra McCann (born 1953), Irish politician
 Fixed-radio access or wireless local loop
 Flash Recovery Area, an Oracle Database technology
 Formula Regional Americas Championship (FRA championship), a Formula 3 regional racing league
 Forward rate agreement
 Full retirement age, in US Social Security

See also